The 1998–99 West Coast Hockey League season was the fourth season of the West Coast Hockey League, a North American minor professional league. Nine teams began the regular season, although the Tucson Gila Monsters folded after 21 games. Tucson's unexpected mid-season exit created schedule irregularities, causing some teams to play 70 regular season games while others played 71.

The Tacoma Sabercats were the league champions.

Regular season

* - folded mid-season

Taylor Cup-Playoffs

External links
 Season 1998/99 on hockeydb.com

West Coast Hockey League seasons
WCHL